Orhan Terzi (born 28 June 1964), better known by his stage name DJ Quicksilver, is a German-Turkish DJ and music producer. His stage name derives from his days taking part in DJ contests, where a mercury column would gauge audience reaction.

Early life
Terzi was born on 28 June 1964 in Trabzon, Turkey. His family moved to Hattingen, Germany in the late 1960s.

Musical career

Early career
He began working with Tommaso de Donatis on DJ Quicksilver material, and released tracks for a variety of record labels, including Avex Trax, Positiva Records, Telstar, Edel AG, Alphabet City, and Sub Terranean.

1997–1998: Breakthrough and success
In 1997 he released "Bellissima" - a hit double A-sided single. The song became a big hit on the UK dance charts and then crossed over into pop, reaching #4 on the UK Singles Chart and selling enough copies to become a gold record, selling well throughout Europe. It remains his biggest single so far. Other releases include "Boombastic", which sampled the Shaggy track.

1999–2002: Other releases
In 1999 he released the track "Heart of Asia" (among others) under the alias "Watergate". In 2002, he received an ECHO nomination for "Best National Dance Act" for the single "Ameno".

Other work
Terzi has also worked as a remixer, on tracks by Ian van Dahl, Faithless, and The Verve ("Bittersweet Symphony").

Discography

Studio albums
 Quicksilver (1997)
 Escape 2 Planet Love (1998)
 Clubfiles One (2003)
 Clubfiles Two (2013)

Singles

Remixes
Dancemania 1 (Compilation, 1996)
Club Scene Volume 2 (Compilation, 1997)
Sonic 1 (Compilation, 2000)
Equinoxe 4 (Trance cover of Jean Michel Jarre's Equinoxe 4)

References

External links

Official Site

German DJs
German dance musicians
German electronic musicians
German techno musicians
Remixers
1964 births
Living people
German trance musicians
German people of Turkish descent
Electronic dance music DJs
People from Trabzon
Positiva Records artists